UMPG may refer to:

 Universal Music Publishing Group, a Vivendi subsidiary
 University of Maine at Portland-Gorham, an American post-secondary institution